The Rhyndaston Tunnel is a , 1-in-40-grade (2.5%) railway tunnel in southern Tasmania. It was built as part of the Tasmanian Main Line Company's track from Hobart to Western Junction which was completed in 1876.

International containers 
The original tunnel was too small to take the original  international containers. The tunnel was widened in the early 1970s using a tunnel boring machine mounted on railway wheels, which was maneuvered into place between trains to excavate a few metres at a time.

The later and larger containers may again be too big.

Due to poor ventilation, diesel trains occasionally lose oxygen and fail to make it up the tunnel.

See also
 Rail transport in Tasmania

References

Railway tunnels in Tasmania
Tunnels completed in 1876